Gia Volski (born January 18, 1957) is a Georgian politician currently serving as First Deputy Speaker of the Parliament of Georgia, having held other important positions within parliament from 2012 onwards.

Biography
Gia Volski was born in Tbilisi and graduated from Tbilisi State University in 1978 with a degree in economics, from 1978 to 1990 he worked in the ministry of trade, briefly between 1990 and 1991 he contributed to the establishment of the Georgian Trade union, from 1991 to 2004 he served as Deputy Representative of the Government of Georgia to the Russian Federation, from 2004 until 2006 he was Deputy Minister of Conflict Resolution Issues. Between 2007 and 2011 he was involved in several NGO's. from 2012 onwards he has been one of the leaders of the Georgian Dream party.

References

1957 births
Tbilisi State University alumni
Georgian Dream politicians
Members of the Parliament of Georgia
Living people
People from Tbilisi